Elections in Northern Ireland are held on a regular basis to local councils, the Northern Ireland Assembly and to the Parliament of the United Kingdom.

The Northern Ireland Assembly has 90 members, elected in 18 five-member constituencies by the single transferable vote (STV) method. Northern Ireland is represented at Westminster by 18 single-member constituencies elected by the first-past-the-post method.

Unlike in the rest of the United Kingdom, elections in Northern Ireland are administered centrally by the Chief Electoral Officer for Northern Ireland and the Electoral Office for Northern Ireland rather than by local authorities.

Elections to the United Kingdom House of Commons
Legend U: Unionist; N: Nationalist; O: Other.

 Sinn Féin have never taken their seats in the United Kingdom House of Commons due to their policy of abstentionism.
 UUP MPs sat as members of the Conservative Party until 1972.

By-elections
Gains are marked with a grey background.

Recall petition
2018 North Antrim recall petition

Referendums

Northern Ireland-specific referendums
 1973 Northern Ireland border poll
 1998 Northern Ireland Good Friday Agreement referendum

United Kingdom-wide referendums
 1975 United Kingdom European Communities membership referendum#Results by United Kingdom constituent countries
 2011 United Kingdom Alternative Vote referendum#Results by constituent countries
 2016 United Kingdom European Union membership referendum#Results by constituent countries & Gibraltar

Elections to the Northern Ireland Assembly
Legend U: Unionist; N: Nationalist; O: Other.

 1998 Northern Ireland Assembly election
 2003 Northern Ireland Assembly election
 2007 Northern Ireland Assembly election
 2011 Northern Ireland Assembly election
 2016 Northern Ireland Assembly election
 2017 Northern Ireland Assembly election
 2022 Northern Ireland Assembly election

Elections to the European Parliament

From 1979 to 2020, three of the seats in the European Parliament allocated to the United Kingdom formed a three-seat constituency elected by single transferable vote. It differed from European Parliament constituencies elsewhere in the United Kingdom which used the D'Hondt method. The United Kingdom withdrew from the European Union on 31 January 2020, and the constituency was abolished.

Ad hoc elections
 1973 Northern Ireland Assembly election
 Northern Ireland Constitutional Convention (election in 1975)
 1982 Northern Ireland Assembly election
 Northern Ireland Forum (election in 1996)

Elections to the Northern Ireland House of Commons
 1921 Northern Ireland general election
 1925 Northern Ireland general election
 1929 Northern Ireland general election
 1933 Northern Ireland general election
 1938 Northern Ireland general election
 1945 Northern Ireland general election
 1949 Northern Ireland general election
 1953 Northern Ireland general election
 1958 Northern Ireland general election
 1962 Northern Ireland general election
 1965 Northern Ireland general election
 1969 Northern Ireland general election

By-elections
List of Northern Ireland Parliament by-elections

Local elections

References

External links
 Adam Carr's Election Archive
 Parties and elections
 Northern Ireland Elections